Joseph John Ridgard Bagshawe (1 July 18701 November 1909) was an English marine painter and member of the Staithes group. He was the grandson of the painter Clarkson Stanfield.

Early life
Born in London, he came from the prominent Catholic Bagshawe family of Wormhill Hall, near Buxton, Derbyshire, and of Oakes-in-Norton, near Sheffield, the second son of County Court Judge William Henry Gunning Bagshawe KC (1825–1901) and his wife Harriet Teresa, daughter of the leading marine painter Clarkson Frederick Stanfield. His father was first cousin of the Cambridge rower William Leonard Gill Bagshawe.

Educated first at Beaumont College and St. Augustine's, Ramsgate, he went on to study art under Hubert Vos at the Royal College of Art at South Kensington in London and, under Edmond van Hove in Bruges.

Career 
He first visited Yorkshire in 1896, and in 1901 became founding secretary of the Staithes Art Club. Shortly afterwards, he settled at the Old Rectory in nearby Whitby, and married Mildred, the daughter of a prominent local shipbuilder, Thomas Turnbull, of Airy Hill, Whitby.

Bagshawe regularly went out to sea with the fishermen, eventually deciding to buy a small yacht which he took out for trips that lasted as long as a fortnight. He also travelled to the coasts of the Netherlands, Normandy, Finland and the West Coast of Ireland to paint.

Working in both oils and watercolours, he exhibited at the Glasgow Institute, the Walker Gallery Liverpool, Manchester City Art Gallery, the Royal Academy (from 1897), the Royal Society of British Artists (elected a member in 1904) and the Royal Institute of Painters in Oils. His work "After Dark" contributed to the Royal Academy in 1907 won special recognition from critics.

He wrote and illustrated articles for The Field, and The Yachting and Boating Monthly, which his son, Gerard Wilfrid Bagshawe, published as a collection in 1933. Joseph Ridgard Bagshawe died at the age of thirty-nine as a result of diabetes. Examples of his work can be found in the Pannet Art Gallery, Whitby and the Victoria and Albert Museum.

Family 
His uncle, The Most Rev. Edward Gilpin Bagshawe D.D. was the Catholic Bishop of Nottingham. His great-granddaughter Louise Mensch is an author and was, for two years, a Member of Parliament; her younger sister Tilly Bagshawe is an author and journalist.

Spelling of name 

His name is frequently misspelled as Joseph Richard Bagshawe in art galleries.

Further reading
Sea Painter: The Life and Work of J.R. Bagshawe, Marine Artist by Peter Frank, Phillimore & Co. Ltd., 2010, 
The Staithes Group, Peter Phillips, Phillips and Sons, Marlow, 1993,

References

1870 births
1909 deaths
19th-century English painters
20th-century English painters
English male painters
British marine artists
Painters from London
Alumni of the Royal College of Art
English Roman Catholics
Deaths from diabetes
Artists' Rifles soldiers
20th-century English male artists
19th-century English male artists